Alexander Ian Sharp (born 2 February 1989) is an English actor. He is known for originating the role of Christopher Boone in the Broadway production of The Curious Incident of the Dog in the Night-Time.

After graduating from the Juilliard School in the summer of 2014, he made his Broadway and acting debut in the play The Curious Incident of the Dog in the Night-Time in the autumn. For his role as the autistic teenager Christopher Boone, he was awarded the Tony Award for Best Actor in a Play, Drama Desk Award for Outstanding Actor in a Play, and the Outer Critics Circle Award.

Early life and education
Sharp was born on 2 February 1989 in Westminster, London, and was raised traveling throughout Europe and the Southwest of the United States in a caravan, before moving to Dorset, England, age eight. He was educated by his mother, a teacher, and his father, who worked in real estate, until the family moved back to England. He has a sister, Nicole, also highly successful in her own field.  His mother homeschooled him with both "rigorous and unorthodox" lessons. Upon his return to Dorset, he was unable to adjust easily to a traditional school environment, and eventually left England at age 18.

Sharp wanted to be an actor from an early age. According to the Irish Mirror, his acting debut was at age 4 when he appeared in A Touch of Frost for £10. According to The Daily Beast, at age 7, he made his acting debut as Piglet in Winnie-the-Pooh.  He also did extensive regional theater work at the Northcott Theater in Exeter. Sharp studied Performing Arts at Yeovil College in Yeovil, Somerset and attended Beaminster Comprehensive School in Dorset.

In 2008, Sharp went to North America and worked as a carpenter and handyman, and in call centers often, in Canada. At times, he traveled to Latin America to pursue physical activities.

When working on a house in Montreal, Sharp decided that he wanted to become an actor. He asked a friend what the best theatre schools were, and the friend told him Yale and Juilliard. Sharp decided on Juilliard due to its location in the middle of Manhattan, and he auditioned with a scene from Hamlet. Against school rules, he also performed a scene from a play that he had written, claiming that it was the work of a little-known English playwright. He was accepted to Juilliard and attended the Drama Division's Group 43. During his time at Juilliard, he wrote and directed a play that was an adaptation of A Clockwork Orange. He graduated from Juilliard with a Bachelor of Fine Arts degree in 2014.

Career 
After graduating from the Juilliard School in the summer of 2014, Sharp made his Broadway and acting debut in the play The Curious Incident of the Dog in the Night-Time in the autumn. For his role as the autistic teenager Christopher Boone, he was awarded the Tony Award for Best Actor in a Play, Drama Desk Award for Outstanding Actor in a Play, and the Outer Critics Circle Award. , he is the youngest winner of the Tony Award for Best Actor in a Play. Sharp's final performance of Curious Incident was 13 September 2015.

In 2017, he starred in John Cameron Mitchell's How to Talk to Girls at Parties, alongside Nicole Kidman, Elle Fanning, and Ruth Wilson.
Also in 2017, Sharp starred alongside Lily Collins and Keanu Reeves in To the Bone, directed by Marti Noxon. To the Bone was released on Netflix on 14 July 2017. The semi-autobiographical movie garnered some controversy regarding its depiction of eating disorders, to which Sharp responded, "I think controversy is an interesting thing in that it usually goes hand in hand with starting conversations that surround taboo or under-discussed topics that need to be discussed and need to be less in the shadows. I would hope that [To the Bone] just creates an awareness and encourages people to talk about [eating disorders]".

Sharp co-starred as activist Rennie Davis in Aaron Sorkin's feature film, The Trial of the Chicago 7, in 2020, alongside Eddie Redmayne, Sacha Baron Cohen, and Joseph Gordon-Levitt. He was also set to star as an unspecified lead part in HBO's untitled Game of Thrones prequel alongside Naomi Watts. Sharp appears in one of the principal supporting roles in the 2022 Oliver Hermanus/Kazuo Ishiguro film Living, starring Bill Nighy.

Theatre credits

Filmography

Film

Television

Awards and nominations
In 2015, he broke Harvey Fierstein's record as the youngest winner of the Tony Award for Best Actor in a Play. In addition to winning the Tony Award in 2015, he also won an Outer Critics Circle Award for Outstanding Leading Actor in a Play, a Theatre World Award in recognition of his Broadway debut. and the Drama Desk Award for Outstanding Actor in a Play. He also received a nomination for the distinguished performance award at the 2015 Drama League Awards. In addition he was nominated for the 2015 Fred and Adele Astaire Awards Outstanding Male Dancer for his work in The Curious Incident of the Dog in the Night-Time. He also won the 2014 Logo TV NewNowNext Awards for Best New Broadway Lead Actor.

References

External links

1989 births
Living people
21st-century British male actors
Audiobook narrators
British male film actors
British male stage actors
British male television actors
British male voice actors
Drama Desk Award winners
Juilliard School alumni
Male actors from London
Outstanding Performance by a Cast in a Motion Picture Screen Actors Guild Award winners
Theatre World Award winners
Tony Award winners